Di Marco or DiMarco is a surname, originally meaning (son) of Marco.

Notable people with the surname include:

Chris DiMarco, American golfer
Damon DiMarco, American historian and biographer
Federico Dimarco, Italian footballer
Magali Di Marco Messmer, Swiss triathlete
Melissa DiMarco, Canadian actress
Nyle DiMarco, American model, actor, and deaf activist

Fictional characters
Johnny DiMarco, a character  in Degrassi: The Next Generation
Beppe di Marco, a character in EastEnders
Gianni di Marco, a character in EastEnders
Joe di Marco, a character in EastEnders
Nicky di Marco, a character in EastEnders
Rosa di Marco, a character in EastEnders
Teresa di Marco, a character in EastEnders

See also 
DeMarco
Italian-language surnames
Patronymic surnames
Surnames from given names